Al-Hams al-Adani is a sub-district located in Sanhan and Bani Bahlul District, Sana'a Governorate, Yemen. Al-Hams al-Adani had a population of 4421 according to the 2004 census.

References 

Sub-districts in Sanhan and Bani Bahlul District